The Piano Guys is an American musical group consisting of pianist Jon Schmidt, cellist Steven Sharp Nelson, videographer Paul Anderson, and music producer Al van der Beek. Originating in Utah, they gained popularity through YouTube, where in 2011 they began posting piano and cello compositions combining classical, pop, film score and original music, showcased through elaborate or cinematic videos. As of March 2020 the group had surpassed 2 billion views on their YouTube channel and had 6.7 million subscribers. Their first eight major-label studio albums, The Piano Guys, The Piano Guys 2, A Family Christmas, Wonders, Uncharted, Christmas Together, Limitless, and 10, each reached number one on Billboard Classical Albums or New Age Albums charts.

History 
The group originated as a social media strategy for Anderson's piano store, The Piano Guys, in St. George, Utah. Schmidt knew Nelson from years of performing and recording together. Anderson was acquainted with Schmidt, a locally notable pianist who often came in to practice on the pianos when he was in town. In 2009 Anderson saw a music video that Schmidt had uploaded to YouTube, "Love Story Meets Viva la Vida" – a musical blend of the Taylor Swift country pop tune and Coldplay's pop song "Viva la Vida", which Schmidt performed with Nelson on cello. That video logged more than one million hits. Anderson asked the musicians to do more videos that he would professionally film and upload to his store's Facebook and YouTube pages to promote his store. Nelson brought his neighbor, van der Beek, a songwriter and music arranger, onto the team. Shaye Scott and Tel Stewart assisted with video production.

"Michael Meets Mozart" (2011) gained a respectable showing after Schmidt invited the people on his fan mailing list "to watch it and share it". In June 2011 the group won the "Most Up-and-Coming Channel" award in the YouTube "On the Rise" contest, which brought 25,000 new subscribers to their channel. In 2011 and 2012 the group uploaded a new music video every week to two weeks, attracting thousands of new viewers each time. Meanwhile, their focus of selling pianos shifted to solely making music videos and they decided to close the piano store, which closed in March 2012.

By September 2012, The Piano Guys had uploaded more than 30 music videos which had garnered 134 million views, and had 757,000 subscribers on their YouTube channel. That month, facilitated by David Simoné and DSW Management, they signed with Sony Masterworks. After signing, they released their first album, The Piano Guys, which sold gold, followed by The Piano Guys 2 and A Family Christmas in 2013, and Wonders in 2014,  which debuted at #12 on the Billboard 200 chart. A fifth album, Uncharted, was released in 2016, followed by a second Christmas album, Christmas Together, the following year. Their seventh major-label album, Limitless, was released in November 2018 on Portrait/Sony Music Masterworks. A new album entitled "10" was released on November 20, 2020, as a celebration of their 10-year anniversary, and of their 10th album so far.

Musical style

The Piano Guys draw on a variety of classical, pop, film score and original music in their compositions for piano and cello. They are especially well known for their mashups of classical and contemporary songs, such as blending Mozart and Adele, Liszt and Coldplay, Tchaikovsky and Shawn Mendes, Bach and Michael Jackson, or Vivaldi's "Winter" and Disney's "Let It Go".

Schmidt, Nelson and van der Beek serve as songwriters for the group. van der Beek engineers, mixes and masters their studio sessions in addition to occasionally adding his own vocals; Anderson oversees the group's video production, while Nelson and Anderson manage the content and business together.

Videography 
The group's YouTube videos show the musicians performing in a variety of settings. These include locations in the Utah desert, at the edge of a 1,000-foot cliff, atop a speeding train, in an ice cave, and at Iguazu Falls, among others. Anderson's goal was "to put pianos and cellos in places nobody would ever expect to see them", thereby generating marketing buzz for his store. In the videos, Schmidt is seen playing a variety of Yamaha grand and baby grand pianos, while Nelson plays custom acoustic and electric cello. They plan to film music videos at each of the New Seven Wonders of the World. As of November 2018, they had performed in front of or on top of four. Videos at the Great Wall of China ("Kung Fu Piano: Cello Ascends"), the Christ the Redeemer statue in Rio de Janeiro ("The Mission/How Great Thou Art"), Chichen Itza ("The Jungle Book/Sarabande"), and Petra ("Indiana Jones and the Arabian Nights") have been completed.

Some songs are composed of several audio tracks mixed together. Occasionally, tracks are superimposed to imitate many instruments played simultaneously. For "Michael Meets Mozart", Nelson prerecorded 100 cello tracks, including percussion effects he made by drumming on the cello itself.

As of March 2019, The Piano Guys have uploaded 85 videos onto their channel and amassed over 1.7 billion views, and 6 million subscribers. Their cover of Christina Perri's "A Thousand Years" is their most-watched video, having logged more than 138 million views as of September 2018. YouTube gave them a plaque at their Greek Theatre Los Angeles concert, commemorating their billionth YouTube view, a feat only achieved by under two hundred YouTube users as of 2019.

Live performances
The Piano Guys tour worldwide. They have appeared in sold-out concerts in the US, Canada, England, Germany, Hungary, Japan, Korea, Australia, and Russia, among others. Since they began touring they have determined to spread out their time on the road as best they can in order to avoid spending too much time away from family. They have also played at major classical and pop venues, including Carnegie Hall, Greek Theatre, Royal Albert Hall and The Grand Ole Opry. 

While many other musical groups declined invitations to perform at the inauguration of Donald Trump in January 2017, the group performed, including a cover of Rachel Platten's Fight Song, which had been played at almost every one of opponent Hillary Clinton's campaign events. The group denied that their performance was "an endorsement or a political statement."

On December 12, 2017, they hosted a live stream on their YouTube channel, called '#LightTheWorld Christmas Concert with The Piano Guys and Friends', accompanied by singers including Peter Hollens and David Archuleta.

Personal lives
Members of The Piano Guys are all middle-aged family men who had other careers before the group gained popularity. Schmidt had a solo musical career with eight albums and seven piano books to his credit; he did solo gigs for two decades. Nelson worked in venture capital and real estate, Anderson owned a piano store, and van der Beek operated a recording studio in his home. After signing with Sony in 2012, all four quit their jobs to pursue their joint musical career. In 2016, Schmidt lost his daughter Annie in a hiking accident. Michelle, his wife, wrote a book about the experience in 2017, titled "Carried: How One Mother’s Trust in God Helped Her through the Unthinkable". The group dedicated a song to Annie in 2017: "The Sweetest Gift".

All four are devout members of the Church of Jesus Christ of Latter-day Saints. Each of them served full-time proselyting missions: Anderson in Washington state, Schmidt in Norway, and Nelson and van der Beek in separate missions in Korea. They have 16 children between them. The group prays together before each recording session, video shoot, concert, and songwriting session, and take inspiration from artists such as Minerva Teichert.

Discography

Studio albums 

Notes

Live albums

Compilation albums

Singles 
2016: "(It's Gonna Be) Okay"

Videography

Awards 
YouTube Music Awards

References

External links 
 
“The Piano Guys Honored by YouTube for Receiving 1 Billion Views! - Live @ Greek Theatre 8/6/16”

American pianists
American cellists
Latter Day Saints from Utah
Music YouTubers
Musical groups established in 2010
Musical groups from Utah
YouTube channels launched in 2010
2010 establishments in Utah